Revelly is a village in Karimnagar district, Choppadandi mandal. It is 35 km from Karimnagar town proper.

Villages in Karimnagar district